The Lee M. Ford House is a historic house in Great Falls, Montana. It was designed in the Prairie School and American Craftsman styles by architect H. N. Black, and built by  C. O. Jarl in 1908. Ford was the son of Robert S. Ford, a pioneer cattleman, and his father built it for him. Ford and architect Black were related. The house has been listed on the National Register of Historic Places since August 10, 1990.

References

National Register of Historic Places in Cascade County, Montana
Houses completed in 1908
1908 establishments in Montana
American Craftsman architecture in Montana
Prairie School architecture in Montana
Houses on the National Register of Historic Places in Montana
Houses in Cascade County, Montana